Subhranshu Roy is an Indian politician of All India Trinamool Congress from the state of West Bengal. He is a two term member of the West Bengal Legislative Assembly. On 29 May 2017, he joined Bharatiya Janata Party and later Trinamool Congress suspended him for six years. He is the former MLA from Bijpur (Vidhan Sabha constituency).

Political career
He is a former leader of the All India Trinamool Congress. On 28 May 2019, he joined the Bharatiya Janata Party in the presence of senior BJP leaders Mukul Roy and Kailash Vijayvargiya.

On 11 June 2021, he along with his father Mukul Roy rejoined All India Trinamool Congress in the presence of Mamata Banerjee and others.

References 

Living people
Trinamool Congress politicians from West Bengal
Year of birth missing (living people)
Bharatiya Janata Party politicians from West Bengal
People from North 24 Parganas district
West Bengal MLAs 2011–2016
West Bengal MLAs 2016–2021